Crowden may refer to:
Crowden, Derbyshire, England
Crowden, a hamlet in the parish of Northlew, Devon, England

See also
Crowdon, a village in the Scarborough district of North Yorkshire, England